Lake Ashmere, or Ashmere Lake, is a small lake in rural Berkshire County of Massachusetts, located in Peru and Hinsdale, Massachusetts.

Usage 
Lake Ashmere is used mostly for recreational purposes. It is owned by the Commonwealth of Massachusetts. There are three summer camps located on the lake:  Camp Danbee, a private girls camp, on the south side and Camp Taconic, a private co-ed camp on the north side of the lake. A third summer camp, Camp Ashmere, a co-ed church operated camp located on the south side of the lake, closed after the Summer 2018 season, and its land was put up for sale, and sold to the new Berkshire Lake Camp. The Berkshire Lake Camp was supposed to open for the summer of 2020, however it was delayed due to the COVID-19 pandemic until the summer of 2021.

Ashmere Lake Dam 

Ashmere Lake Dam is of earthen construction, a gravity dam.

Exact location 
The lake is divided by Route 143 which cuts it approximately in half. The easiest way to access the lake is by taking Route 143 north from Route 8 in Hinsdale, from which you can take exits to access vacation and permanent homes on the lake. There is only one public access which is on the extreme south corner of the lake.

References

Reservoirs in Massachusetts
Lakes of Berkshire County, Massachusetts